Curaleaf Holdings, Inc. is an American cannabis company publicly traded on the Canadian stock exchange. The company is headquartered in Wakefield, Massachusetts.  Founded in 2010, it produces and distributes cannabis products in North America, operating dispensaries in 23 states. The company is headquartered in Wakefield, Massachusetts, and is the world's largest cannabis company by revenue.

History

Curaleaf was founded in 2010 under the name PalliaTech. It operated in New Jersey and had a research center in Colorado. In 2013, the investment group Sputnik purchased a 35% stake in the company. The company name was changed to Curaleaf in 2018, just prior to going public on Toronto's Canadian Securities Exchange under the symbol CURA. It also raised $400 million in what was considered the largest stock offering in cannabis industry history.

Curaleaf has made several acquisitions in the cannabis industry. It acquired the cannabis oil brand Select in 2019, making it the largest cannabis operator in the United States. The following year it acquired Colorado based edibles maker BlueKudu, which is known for its infused chocolates and gummies. In 2020, Curaleaf became the world's largest cannabis company by revenue after the purchase of its Chicago-based competitor Grassroots Cannabis. The purchase also expanded the company into 23 states in the U.S.

In January 2021, Joseph Bayern, previously the president of Curaleaf, became its CEO.

In April 2021, Curaleaf announced that it had completed its previously announced acquisition of EMMAC Life Sciences Limited ("EMMAC"), the largest vertically integrated independent cannabis company in Europe. The acquisition gives Curaleaf cultivation, EU GMP-certified processing, distribution, and R&D operations in several key European cannabis markets, including the United Kingdom, Germany, Italy, Spain and Portugal.

In May 2021, Curaleaf announced it had signed a definitive agreement to acquire Los Sueños Farms, a 36-acre outdoor marijuana growing operation in Colorado, for over $60 million.

In September 2021, an Oregon subsidiary of the company, Cura Cannabis, mistakenly distributed tinctures with THC that were mislabeled as containing only CBD. This led to a recall by The Oregon Liquor and Cannabis Commission (OLCC).

In August 2022 Curaleaf was forced to remove thousands of medical marijuana products from New York dispensaries for misleading customers into believing the potency of the products was higher than it was by using an unauthorized labeling method.

References

External links

 

Cannabis companies of Canada
Cannabis companies of the United States
American companies established in 2010
Publicly traded companies of the United States